Type 27 may refer to:
Bristol Type 27, a British civil utility biplane
Peugeot Type 27, an automobile made by Peugeot
Nieuport Type 27, a French biplane fighter aircraft
German Type U 27 submarine, a  U-boat built for service in the Imperial German Navy 
Type 27, a British hardened field defence of World War II

See also
27 (disambiguation)